    

Elena Baramova (Bulgarian: Елена Баръмова) is a Bulgarian-born operatic soprano.

Biography

Born in Bulgaria, Elena Baramova studied opera singing at the National Academy of Music (Bulgaria), Sofia, under the tutelage of Professor Konstanza Vatchkova, later at the Boris Christoff Academy in Rome, under Mirella Parutto, and from 2001, under the guidance of Ghena Dimitrova. In 2001-02 she sang in concerts with Ghena Dimitrova in Bulgaria, Vienna, Prague and Budapest.

Baramova won competition prizes at the Julian Gaiare International, Pamplona, produced by José Carreras, and at the Rijeka Belcanto International Opera Competition in Croatia. She was a laureate at the Hristo Brambarov International Competition, and won first prize for best performance of Hungarian and Bulgarian songs at the Hungarian Cultural Institute, Sofia.

She performed at Sofia National Opera as "Donna Elvira" in Don Giovanni, "Lady Macbeth" in Macbeth, "Elvira" in Ernani, "Minnie" in La fanciulla del West, and in  Tosca, Turandot and Norma, and gave guest performances of "Aida" at the Polish National Opera, Avenches Opera Festival, the Classic Openair Solothurn, Switzerland, Cairo Opera House, and the Taipei Arena, Taiwan in a Teatro dell'Opera di Roma and Taipei Symphony Orchestra co-production.

Baramova played "Lady Macbeth" in Verdi's Macbeth at the Großes Festspielhaus, Salzburg, the Teatro Principal de Alicante, Spain, and the Grand Theatre, Łódź, "Abigaille" in Nabucco at Teatr Wielki, Poland, Prague State Opera, Estonian National Opera, Vorst Nationaal, Brussels, Stadsschouwburg, Amsterdam,  and the Grenslandhallen, Hasselt, Belgium.

With Turandot she performed at the Opéra de Massy, Paris, Prague State Opera, Tokyo Bunka Kaikan, Aichi Arts Center, Nagoya, the National Sun Yat-sen Memorial Hall,  Taipei, the Chiang Kai-shek Memorial Hall, Taipei, and Festival Lirica, Massa Marittima, Teatro delle Fonti, Ripatransone, and Teatro D'Annunzio, Pescara in Italy

She played "Elvira" in Don Giovanni at Classic Openair Solothurn, Switzerland, Tosca at Teatr Wielki, Łodz, "Elvira" in Ernani at the Varna International Music Festival, Bulgaria,  and "Amelia" in Un Ballo in Maschera at Cairo Opera House.

Baramova was a guest soloist with Orchestra Ensemble Kanazawa, Japan, and the Orchestra of the Conservatory of Bern at Arènes d’Avenches.

Repertoire

"Turandot" – Turandot
"Minnie" – La fanciulla del West
"Tosca" – Tosca
"Madama Butterfly" – Cio-Cio San
"Santuzza" – Cavalleria rusticana
"Lady Macbeth" – Macbeth
"Abigaille" – Nabucco
"Elvira" – Ernani
"Elisabetta" – Don Carlo
"Aida" – Aida
"Leonora" – Il trovatore
"Norma" – Norma
"Fiordiligi" – Cosi fan tutte
"Donna Elvira" – Don Giovanni

Photo gallery

External links

Official Blog Site: Elena Baramova - Soprano
Turandot - Opera de Massy
Aida - Avenches Opera Festival
Turandot - Lirica in Piazza, Massa Marittima, Italy
Macbeth, Spain

Year of birth missing (living people)
Living people
Musicians from Sliven
Bulgarian operatic sopranos
21st-century Bulgarian women opera singers